Blatné Remety is a village and municipality in the Sobrance District in the Košice Region of east Slovakia.

History
In historical records the village was first mentioned in 1340.

Geography
The village lies at an altitude of 103 metres and covers an area of 6.228 km2.
It has a population of about 500 people.

Culture
The village has a public library a gym and a football pitch

Genealogical resources

The records for genealogical research are available at the state archive "Statny Archiv in Presov, Slovakia"

 Greek Catholic church records (births/marriages/deaths): 1834–1895 (parish B)
 Reformated church records (births/marriages/deaths): 1797–1916 (parish B)

See also
 List of municipalities and towns in Slovakia

External links
 
http://en.e-obce.sk/obec/blatneremety/blatne-remety.html
https://web.archive.org/web/20071116010355/http://www.statistics.sk/mosmis/eng/run.html
https://web.archive.org/web/20131102115936/http://www.blatneremety.sk/
Surnames of living people in Blatne Remety

Villages and municipalities in Sobrance District